Međureč  (old name Međurečje (Међуречје)) is a village in the municipality of Jagodina, Serbia. According to the 2002 census, the village had a population of 430.

References

Populated places in Pomoravlje District